The EL/M-2248 MF-STAR is a multifunction active electronically scanned array naval radar system developed by IAI Elta for maritime installation on warships. It is capable of tracking both air and surface targets and providing fire control guidance. MF-STAR is an acronym of Multi-Function Surveillance, Track And Guidance Radar.

Design and description 
The EL/M-2248 MF-STAR is a multifunction solid state Active electronically scanned array radar developed for a new generation of naval platforms. The radar system is made up of 4 active arrays operating in the S-band, each of the 4 arrays is positioned in one direction. The radar employs multi-beam and pulse Doppler techniques as-well-as robust Electronic counter-countermeasures techniques to extract low radar cross-section targets from complex clutter and jamming environments. AESA radars provide a low probability of intercept of emitted signals and help the ships remain stealthy. Weighing only seven tons the system can be installed on smaller vessels of Corvette size and above.

The MF-STAR is capable of tracking both air and surface targets and can track hundreds of targets simultaneously with a very fast refresh rate. It is capable of providing guidance illumination and mid course updates to both active and semi active Surface-to-air missiles and Anti-ship missiles, with multiple simultaneous engagement capability. It is also capable of automatic splash detection and correction for naval gunnery support.

While targets are tracked at long range threats are automatically recognized at medium range and Automatic track initiation takes place. Sea skimming attacking missile are tracked at >25 km while High flying fighter aircraft are automatically tracked at >250 km.

Performance and Parameters

Operators

Kolkata-class destroyer
Visakhapatnam-class destroyer 
INS Vikrant
Nilgiri-class frigate 

Sa'ar 5-class corvette (only on INS Lahav)
Sa'ar 6-class corvette 

ROKS Marado

See also
EL/M-2258 ALPHA (rotating variant of ELM-2248)
EL/M-2080 Green Pine
EL/M-2238 STAR
Barak 8
Phased array
Active electronically scanned array
Active phased array radar
AN/SPY-3
AN/SPY-6
OPS-24
OPS-50
SAMPSON
Selex RAT-31DL
Selex RAN-40L
Type 346 Radar

References

Sea radars
Military radars of Israel
Elta products